Bilz y Pap (Spanish for Bilz and Pap) is the combined marketing name of the two most popular and highest selling domestically-produced soft drinks in Chile.

Overview
Although the names are often used in conjunction as part of their advertising strategy, Bilz and Pap are the marketing names of two distinct flavors of soda produced by the Chilean Compañia de Cervecerias Unidas, S.A. (CCU) beverage corporation. Bilz is an artificially flavored red colored fantasy soft drink, and Pap is its papaya flavored counterpart. 

The corporation also produces a third flavor of pineapple soda known as Kem. In recent years, CCU is also marketing zero calorie diet versions of Bilz and Pap, better known as Bilz Light, and Pap Light. 

Bilz was first introduced at the beginning of the 20th century from Germany, where it had been created by German scientist Friedrich Eduard Bilz and would later become Sinalco.

Bilz y Pap also refers to the extraterrestrial red and yellow characters, "Bily Bilz" and "Maik Pap" used in commercials, print advertising, and on the Internet to promote the soft drinks.

Recently they have introduced an extra flavour to the market called "Pop", another three different soft drink with artificial grape, cherry or cotton candy flavour.

External links
 Official site

Soft drinks
Chilean drinks
Fictional duos
Products introduced in 1905
Products introduced in 1927
Chilean brands
Fictional extraterrestrial characters